Love's Redemption is a 1921 American silent adventure drama film directed by Albert Parker and starring Norma Talmadge, Harrison Ford, and Montagu Love. The film is presumed to be lost.

Plot
As described in a film magazine, Ginger (Talmadge), a young Jamaican woman, secures a position as a housekeeper for Englishman Clifford Standish (Ford), a wealthy plantation owner, when Captain Bill Hennessey (Barnes), with whom she had lived for several years, sails away for England. Clifford struggles as he is addicted to drink. Ginger saves Clifford from being robbed by some locals, and then by reforming him she induces him to give up drink and take an interest in running the plantation. Clifford falls in love with her and, on the day they are married, his brother John (Cliffe) arrives from England. He brings news that Clifford has inherited a vast estate. They return to England where his mother (Waterman) and former sweetheart meet Ginger with carefully rehearsed hauteur. During a card game Ginger discovers one player is cheating with marked cards and the Englishman is exposed. Cliff and his bride Ginger return to the West Indies to get away from the pretense and hypocrisy of the society she had been thrust into.

Cast
 Norma Talmadge as Jennie Dobson (aka Ginger)
 Harrison Ford as Clifford Standish
 Montagu Love as Frederick Kent
 H. Cooper Cliffe as John Standish
 Ida Waterman as Mrs. Standish
 Michael M. Barnes as Captain Bill Hennessey
 E.L. Fernandez as Overseer
 Frazer Coulter as Club Steward

Production
The film's working title was Regeneration Isle.

References

External links

American silent feature films
Films directed by Albert Parker
American black-and-white films
Lost American films
American adventure films
1920s adventure films
1921 lost films
1921 films
Lost adventure films
1920s American films
Silent adventure films
1920s German-language films